This is a list of all the United States Supreme Court cases from volume 346 of the United States Reports:

External links

1953 in United States case law
1954 in United States case law